Abediterol (INN; development codes AZD-0548 and LAS 100977) is a once-daily experimental drug candidate for the treatment of asthma and chronic obstructive pulmonary disease (COPD). It is currently under development by the Spanish pharmaceutical company Almirall and is in Phase II clinical trials.

It acts as a dual β2 adrenergic agonist and muscarinic antagonist and is classified as an ultra-long-acting β2 agonist (ultra-LABA).

Its coformulation with mometasone furoate is also in Phase II clinical trials.

References 

Long-acting beta2-adrenergic agonists
Muscarinic antagonists
Organofluorides
2-Quinolones
Phenols
Phenylethanolamines